Eustala cepina is a species of orb weaver in the family of spiders known as Araneidae. It is found in North America.

References

Araneidae
Articles created by Qbugbot
Spiders described in 1841